Hendra Sandi Gunawan (born 10 February 1995) is an Indonesian former footballer who last played as a midfielder for Aceh United. Previously, he played for Bali United, Sriwijaya and Persiba Balikpapan in the Liga 1. He is part of the national team squad of Indonesia U-19.

Personal life
Beside being a football player, he is also a member of Indonesian National Police

Honours

International
Indonesia U19
 AFF U-19 Youth Championship: 2013

References

External links
 
 Hendra Sandi at Eurosport

Indonesian footballers
Sriwijaya F.C. players
Bali United F.C. players
1995 births
Living people
Association football midfielders
Sportspeople from Aceh